The General Directorate for Internal Security (DGSI) is a French security agency. It is charged with counter-espionage, counter-terrorism, countering cybercrime and surveillance of potentially threatening groups, organisations, and social phenomena.

The agency was created in 2008 under the name Central Directorate of Interior Intelligence (DCRI), merging the direction centrale des Renseignements généraux (RG) and the direction de la surveillance du territoire (DST) of the French National Police. It acquired its current name in 2014, with a small structural shift: contrary to the DCRI which was part of the National Police, the DGSI reports directly to the Ministry of the Interior.

The DGSI is headed by General Director Nicolas Lerner. The agency is informally known as the "RG", a nickname formerly used for the Direction centrale des renseignements généraux which merged into it.

The DGSI performs among the others the following tasks:
prevents and halts any action or interference from foreign entities; fights acts of terrorism or acts that threaten the security and sustainability of the state or undermine the integrity of the territory; participates in the surveillance of radicalised individuals and groups who may turn to violence and threaten national security; fights against international criminal organisations that may have an impact on national security. As Aleksander Olech, the DGSI is the only secret service in the French Republic to cooperate directly with judicial institutions (l’institution judiciaire).

History

Direction centrale du renseignement intérieur (DCRI) 

The fusion of the RG and the DST into the Direction centrale du renseignement intérieur (DCRI) was a wish held by Nicolas Sarkozy when he was France's Minister of the Interior. The change was officially launched by the Council of Ministers on 20 June 2007, shortly after the election of Sarkozy as President. Minister of the Interior Michèle Alliot-Marie, however, was reputedly reluctant regarding this fusion and ordered the General Director of the Police Nationale, Frédéric Péchenard, to undertake a study of the proposal.

The creation of DCRI was announced on 13 September 2007 by Alliot-Marie.  The founding texts of the DCRI were adopted 7 April 2008, to become effective 1 July 2008.

A fraction of the former functionaries of the Renseignement général (General Intelligence, RG) were brought in from the Sub-Direction of General Information (SDIG) from the Central Direction of Public Security, represented in the departments of metropolitan France and in its overseas territories by the departmental services of General Information, in the care of the departmental directorates of Public Security.

Bernard Squarcini, director of DST, was named head of the DCRI in 2008. He was assisted from the outset by two central adjunct directors, René Bailly, former functionary of the RG, and Patrick Calvar, former functionary of the DST. René Bailly then left the DCRI in the month of June 2009 to take leadership of the new direction of intelligence of the Paris police (DRPP), Patrick Calvar named director of intelligence of external security(DGSE) is replaced in his post at the beginning of 2010 by Frédéric Veaux, until then sub-director of the Central Directorate of the Judicial Police.

One of the first media appearances of the new DCRI was the arrest of Julien Coupat in the context of the "Tarnac Affair".

In December 2008, the leadership of the DCRI made priority of surveilling an impending plot orchestrated by an Islamist in the region of Paris.

By a decree of 31 May 2012, Patrick Calvar, former adjunct operational director of the DCRI and director of intelligence at the DGSE since 2009, was named central director of interior intelligence, replacing Squarcini.

Direction générale de la Sécurité intérieure (DGSI) 

Along with the change in majority politics in spring 2012, the executive and legislative powers sought to re-assess the role of the DCRI. In May 2013, a parliamentary report on the intelligence services was presented by the deputy PS Jean-Jacques Urvoas and his colleague UMP Patrice Verchère. The report was critical of the DCRI's functioning and particularly the treatment of the Toulouse and Montauban shootings. On 17 June 2012 the Minister of the Interior Manuel Valls announced a reform pertinent to French domestic intelligence. This reform was officialised by the decree no. 2014-445 from 30 April 2014, which started vigorously on 12 May 2014. The DCRI became the Direction générale de la Sécurité intérieure (DGSI), is no longer situated under the authority of the General Director of the Police Nationale but under that of the Minister of the Interior, with more authority. The DGSI preserved the connections of its operatives, who required contractors (engineers, programmers, linguists) Patrick Calvar is set to continue his function.

Controversy 

In April 2013, the French Wikipedia article on the military radio station of Pierre-sur-Haute attracted attention after the  attempted to have the article removed from the French Wikipedia. The Wikimedia Foundation asked the intelligence agency what precise parts of the article were a problem in the eyes of the intelligence agency. The  refused to give these details, and repeated its demand for total deletion of the article.

The Wikimedia Foundation refused to delete the article, and the  pressured an administrator, threatening detention and prosecution, of the French language Wikipedia and resident of France, into removing the article.

According to a statement by the Wikimedia Foundation,

The DCRI summoned a Wikipedia volunteer in their offices on April 4th [2013]. This volunteer, which was one of those having access to the tools that allow the deletion of pages, was forced to delete the article while in the DCRI offices, on the understanding that he would have been held in custody and prosecuted if he did not comply. Under pressure, he had no other choice than to delete the article, despite explaining to the DCRI this is not how Wikipedia works. He warned the other sysops that trying to undelete the article would engage their responsibility before the law. This volunteer had no link with that article, having never edited it and not even knowing of its existence before entering the DCRI offices. He was chosen and summoned because he was easily identifiable, given his regular promotional actions of Wikipedia and Wikimedia projects in France.

Later, the article was restored by other Wikipedia contributors. The French Ministry of the Interior told Agence France-Presse that for the moment it did not wish to comment on the incident.

Investigations
The DGSI was tasked with co-leading the terror investigation into the 2017 Notre Dame attack together with the National Centre for Counter Terrorism.

See also 

 National Centre for Counter Terrorism
 Internal security
 Homeland security

References

External links 
 Official website (french)
 Official announcement of the agency's launch on the website of the French Ministry of the Interior.
 News coverage on Intelligence Online

2008 establishments in France
 
French intelligence agencies
Domestic intelligence agencies